Shin Su-ran (born July 15, 1986), also known by her stage names Elena and Baily Shoo and better known by the mononym Suran, is a South Korean singer. She debuted as part of the duo Lodia on July 9, 2014, with the single "I Got a Feeling".

Career

2017–present: "Wine" and Walkin 
In January 2017, she appeared on MBC's King of Mask Singer (episodes 93–94) as a contestant named "Skip to the End, Hello".

On April 24, 2017, the singer released a digital single called "Wine" in a collaborative production including BTS' Suga, Slow Rabbit, Suran herself, and featuring rapper Changmo, who also co-produced. The song peaked at number two on the Gaon Digital Chart, selling over 500,000 digital downloads by the end of May.

After the success of the single, the singer released her debut extended play, [[Walkin' (EP)|Walkin''']], on June 2, 2017, peaking at number 30 on the Gaon Album Chart. The title track "1+1=0" featuring Dean was released on the same day, peaking at number 32 on the Gaon Digital Chart and selling over 100,000 digital downloads.

 Personal life 
In an episode of Video Star'' in April 2019, Suran revealed that she was diagnosed with breast cancer in 2015, which resulted in her having a mastectomy.

Discography

Extended plays

Singles

Awards and nominations

Notes

References

External links
 

Living people
South Korean women pop singers
South Korean hip hop singers
Melon Music Award winners
21st-century South Korean women singers
1986 births